Kangeq Peninsula is a peninsula of Greenland. It is located in the Upernavik Archipelago. The Kangerlussuaq Fjord (Kangeq Peninsula) cuts across the peninsula in a north–south direction.

References 

Peninsulas of the Upernavik Archipelago